Poole is an unincorporated community and census-designated place (CDP) in Webster and Henderson counties, Kentucky, United States. The center of Poole is in northern Webster County, and the community extends north into southern Henderson County.

Demographics

References

Census-designated places in Webster County, Kentucky
Census-designated places in Henderson County, Kentucky
Census-designated places in Kentucky